The following is a list of MTV Asia Awards winners for Favorite Artist Korea.

Korea Favorite Artist
South Korean music awards